The Shire of Maroochy was a local government area about  north of Brisbane in the Sunshine Coast region of South East Queensland, Australia.

History 

In 1842, Andrew Petrie explored the coast north of Brisbane and discovered the Mary River with a small party including two Aboriginal men from the Brisbane River region who spoke the Yuggera language. Their name for the local black swan was "Muru-kutchi" or "red-bill". Petrie hence named the area Maroochy.

The area was originally incorporated as part of the Caboolture Divisional Board on 11 November 1879 under the Divisional Boards Act 1879. It did not initially contain Buderim or Kenilworth. The first elections were held on 13 September for three councillors, each of whom represented one subdivision. By 1895, council chambers had been erected firstly on Blackall Terrace and then at Station Square adjacent to the Nambour railway station, where they were to continue meeting until 1978.

With the passage of the Local Authorities Act 1902, Maroochy became a shire council on 31 March 1903. The first land sale in Maroochydore in 1908 allowed  along the coast to be opened up, allowing for the development of the towns of Alexandra Headland and Mooloolaba. The council commenced supplying electricity in 1927, and a hospital was opened in 1930. With the start of major development in South East Queensland in the late 1950s, Maroochy Airport (now Sunshine Coast Airport, the major regional facility) was opened in 1961. The Shire grew rapidly from this point onwards.

Fires were a persistent problem in the hinterland region, and on Anzac Day in 1948, a fire significantly damaged the Shire Chambers. In 1978, the Shire moved its offices to a new location in Bury Street, Nambour, with the old facility in Civic Square remaining as a civic hall. On 15 August 1986 a fire damaged this beyond repair—it was bulldozed three years later to make way for the new Centenary Square development.

In 2000, Queensland police arrested a man for using a computer and a radio transmitter to take control of the Maroochy Shire wastewater system and release sewage into parks, rivers and property.

On 15 March 2008, under the Local Government (Reform Implementation) Act 2007 passed by the Parliament of Queensland on 10 August 2007, the Shire of Maroochy merged with the Shire of Noosa and the City of Caloundra to form the Sunshine Coast Region.

Structure 
The Shire was subdivided into 12 numbered divisions, each of which returned one councillor, and an elected mayor.

Towns and localities 
The Shire of Maroochy included the following settlements:

 Alexandra Headland
 Belli Park
 Bli Bli
 Bridges
 Buderim
 Burnside
 Chevallum
 Coes Creek
 Coolabine
 Cooloolabin
 Coolum Beach
 Cotton Tree
 Diddillibah
 Doonan1
 Dulong
 Eerwah Vale1
 Eudlo
 Eumundi
 Flaxton
 Forest Glen
 Gheerulla
 Highworth
 Hunchy

 Ilkley
 Image Flat
 Kenilworth
 Kiamba
 Kidaman Creek2
 Kiels Mountain
 Kulangoor
 Kuluin
 Kunda Park
 Kureelpa
 Landers Shoot
 Mapleton
 Marcoola
 Maroochy River
 Maroochydore
 Mons
 Montville
 Mooloolaba
 Mount Coolum
 Mountain Creek
 Mudjimba
 Nambour
 Ninderry

 North Arm
 Obi Obi
 Pacific Paradise
 Palmwoods
 Parklands
 Peregian Beach1
 Peregian Springs
 Perwillowen
 Point Arkwright
 Rosemount
 Sippy Downs
 Tanawha
 Towen Mountain
 Twin Waters
 Valdora
 Verrierdale
 West Woombye
 Weyba Downs
 Woombye
 Yandina Creek
 Yandina
 Yaroomba

1 - split with the Shire of Noosa
2 - split with the City of Caloundra

Population

Chairmen and mayors
 1927: J. T. Lowe
 1952-1967: David Low
 1967-1982: Eddie De Vere 
 1982-1985: Don Culley 
 1985-1994: Fred Murray
 1994-1997: Bob King
 1997-2000: Don Culley
 2000-2004: Alison Grosse
 2004-2008: Joe Natoli

Sister cities
 Tatebayashi, Japan
 Xiamen, China

See also
 List of tramways in Queensland

References

Further reading
  (196 pages)
  (79 pages)
  (120 pages)

External links
 University of Queensland: Queensland Places: Maroochy and Maroochy Shire

Sunshine Coast, Queensland
Former local government areas of Queensland
2008 disestablishments in Australia
Populated places disestablished in 2008